"Nothing but a Heartache" is a Pop and Northern Soul hit originally released on the Deram Records label in November 1968 by South Carolina trio The Flirtations. The song was produced by Wayne Bickerton and co-written by Bickerton and Tony Waddington, who were later responsible for the 1970s successes of The Rubettes.

Commercial performance
"Nothing But a Heartache" reached the Top 40 in both the Netherlands (No. 33) and in the US, where it spent two weeks at No. 34 in late May 1969 during what was then considered a lengthy 14-week run on [[Billboard Hot 100|Billboard'''s Hot 100]] – especially for a hit that did not reach the top 30.  The single did, however, reach No. 31 on Cash Box and No. 25 on Record World''.

In late April 1969, "Nothing but a Heartache" reached No. 3 in Boston on WRKO-AM. In Canada it reached No. 31 and in Australia it charted at No. 97. Two promotional videos—one in color and one in black-and-white—were filmed for the song. The colour video was shot at Tintern Abbey in Wales.

Charts

Covers
In October 2017, American punk rock/hip hop band the Transplants recorded it for their Take Cover EP.

References

External links
 

1968 singles
Songs written by Wayne Bickerton
Deram Records singles
1968 songs
Songs written by Tony Waddington (songwriter)
Northern soul songs